Kõiv is an Estonian surname. The word means "birch" in Võro. 

According to the Estonian Population Register, there lived 1,242 people with the surname Kõiv in Estonia, as of 8 May 2012.

Notable bearers of the name Kõiv include:

Karl Kõiv (1894–1972), featherweight weightlifter 
Kauri Kõiv (born 1983), biathlete
Kerli Kõiv (born 1987), singer and songwriter
Küllo Kõiv (1972–1998), wrestler
Madis Kõiv (1929–2014), author, physicist and philosopher
Tõnis Kõiv (born 1970), politician
Tõnu Kõiv (born 1968), politician

See also
Koivu, a Finnish surname of the same etymology
Kask, a more common Estonian surname with the same meaning

References

Estonian-language surnames